The Medieval World Series is a history book series published first by Longman and later by Routledge. Works in the series are intended to be an introduction to the authors' specialist subjects and a summing up of the current scholarship and debates of the relevant subjects.

The founding editor of the series was David Bates. Julia M.H. Smith was a former editor. The editor as of 2015 is Warren C. Brown.

Selected titles

2010s
The Viking Diaspora, Judith Jesch, 2015.
Medieval Monasticism: Forms of Religious Life in Western Europe in the Middle Ages, 4th Edition, C.H. Lawrence, 2015.
The Cistercian Order in Medieval Europe 1090-1500, Emilia Jamroziak, 2013.
Church and People in the Medieval West, 900-1200, Sarah Hamilton, 2013.
The Cathars: Dualist Heretics in Languedoc in the High Middle Ages, 2nd Edition, Malcolm Barber, 2013.
Disunited Kingdoms: Peoples and Politics in the British Isles 1280-1460, Michael Brown, 2013.
Christian Jewish Relations 1000-1300: Jews in the Service of Medieval Christendom, Anna Sapir Abulafia, 2011.
Violence in Medieval Europe, Warren C. Brown, 2010.

2000s
Europe's Barbarians AD 200-600, Edward James, 2009.
Edward the Black Prince: Power in Medieval Europe, David Green, 2007.
The Devil's World: Heresy and Society 1100-1300, Andrew Roach, 2005.
The Mongols and the West: 1221-1410, Peter Jackson, 2005.
The Crusader States and their Neighbours: 1098-1291, P.M. Holt, 2004.
The Fourth Crusade: Event and Context, Michael J. Angold, 2003.
The Godwins: The Rise and Fall of a Noble Dynasty, Frank Barlow, 2003.
Margery Kempe and her world, A.E. Goodman, 2002.
The Welsh Princes: The Native Rulers of Wales 1063-1283, Roger K. Turvey, 2002.
Crime in Medieval Europe: 1200-1550, Trevor Dean, 2001.
The Age of Robert Guiscard: Southern Italy and the Northern Conquest, Graham Loud, 2000.
The Reign of Richard Lionheart: Ruler of The Angevin Empire, 1189-1199, Ralph V. Turner & Richard Heiser, 2000.
The Age of Charles Martel, Paul Fouracre, 2000.
The English Church, 940-1154, H.R. Loyn, 2000.

1990s
Ambrose: Church and Society in the Late Roman World, John Moorhead, 1999.
Alfred the Great: War, Kingship and Culture in Anglo-Saxon England, Richard Abels, 1998.
Abbot Suger of St-Denis: Church and State in Early Twelfth-Century France, Lindy Grant, 1998.
Charles I of Anjou: Power, Kingship and State-Making in Thirteenth-Century Europe, Jean Dunbabin, 1998.
Philip Augustus: King of France 1180-1223, Jim Bradbury, 1997.
The Western Mediterranean Kingdoms: The Struggle for Dominion, 1200-1500, David S.H. Abulafia, 1997.
The Formation of English Common Law: Law and Society in England from the Norman Conquest to Magna Carta, John Hudson, 1996.
Bastard Feudalism, M.A. Hicks, 1995.
Medieval Canon Law, James A. Brundage, 1995.
Justinian, John Moorhead, 1994.
English Noblewomen in the Later Middle Ages, Jennifer C. Ward, 1992.
Charles The Bald, Janet L. Nelson, 1992.

See also
The Medieval Mediterranean (book series)
Routledge Studies in Medieval Religion and Culture

References 

Series of history books
Longman books
Routledge books